Boys in Brown is a 1949 black and white British drama film directed by Montgomery Tully, which depicts life in a borstal for young offenders. It stars Jack Warner, Richard Attenborough, Dirk Bogarde and Jimmy Hanley. It is based on a 1940 play by the actor Reginald Beckwith.

The title comes from the borstal uniform: brown shirt and shorts and a short brown tie.

Plot
Teenager Jackie Knowles (Richard Attenborough) drives a getaway car in a robbery. He is captured and sentenced to serve three years in a borstal institution run by a sympathetic governor (Jack Warner). He befriends Alfie (Dirk Bogarde) and Bill (Jimmy Hanley).

During an in-house concert party Jackie sneaks into one of the staff rooms. He removes the light-bulb s when a man enters he is unseen. But he is spotted and a fight ensues in which Jackie knocks the man out with a lamp. He thinks he has killed him. He escapes with half a dozen others including Alfie.

When caught the injured man awaits a critical operation in hospital and there may still be a murder charge. Alfie decides to confess to the crime not realising he might hang.

Jackie eventually confesses. His girl says she is happy to wait three years for him.

Premise

As the maximum age one could attend a borstal was 18 (i.e. a 19 year old must go to an adult prison), Jackie's three year sentence places him as under 16. His age is not stated. Attenborough was 25/26 at he time of filming, neither he nor any of the other "boys" pass as teenagers. Bogarde was 28.

Cast
 Jack Warner as Governor 
 Richard Attenborough as Jackie Knowles 
 Dirk Bogarde as Alfie Rawlins 
 Jimmy Hanley as Bill Foster 
 Barbara Murray as Kitty Hurst, Jackie's girlfriend
 Patrick Holt as Tigson 
 Andrew Crawford as Casey 
 Thora Hird as Mrs. Knowles, Jackie's mum
 Graham Payn as Plato Cartwright 
 Michael Medwin as Alf 'Sparrow' Thompson 
 John Blythe as 'Bossy' Phillips 
 Alfie Bass as 'Basher' Walker
 Philip Stainton as Principal prison officer
 Ben Williams as Borstal Master
 Cyril Chamberlain as Mr. Johnson

Production
The film was shot at Pinewood. Associate producer Alfred Roome called it a "near disaster".

Critical reception
The Monthly Film Bulletin wrote "the film creditably abstains from exploiting its serious subject in a sensational way," and from the "excellent cast" the critic singled out "Richard Attenborough and Thora Hird, a compelling appearance by Jack Warner as the Governor marred only by a tendency to hang out flags when he is about to deliver a Message; and the "boys" (surely a little old for Borstal?) include Jimmy Hanley, Dirk Bogarde and Michael Medwin"; while Time Out wrote "The fairly outspoken (for 1949) script criticises a system portrayed as suffering from cash starvation (echoed by the film's own rock-bottom budget) yet required to cope with hordes of incorrigibles: a recidivism rate of 75 per cent is indicated. It's a blend of cosy stereotypes, reforming zeal and post-war disillusion amounting to a gloomy admonition not to expect very much from life. A British noir, in that sense."

References

External links

Boys in Brown at BFI Screenonline

1949 films
1949 drama films
Films directed by Montgomery Tully
British black-and-white films
Films shot at Pinewood Studios
British prison drama films
1940s prison films
1940s British films